Minister of Healthcare (Ukraine) is a member of the Cabinet of Ministers of Ukraine and a top government official heading the Ministry of Healthcare. The minister is appointed by the Prime Minister, while is dismissed by the President.

List of ministers

National Ukraine
 10/1917 – 01/1918 Borys Matyushenko
 01/1918 – 04/1918 Yevmen Lukasevych
 05/1918 – 12/1918 Vsevolod Lyubynsky
 12/1918 – 02/1919 Ovksentiy Korchak-Chepurkivsky

Soviet Ukraine
 01/1919 – 02/1919 P.Tutyshkin
 02/1919 – 04/1919 Oleksandr Vinokurov
 04/1920 – 1925 Moisei Hurevych
 1925 – 1929 D.Yefimov
 1929 – 1937 Solomon Kantarovych
 1937 – 01/1944 Ivan Ovsiyenko
 01/1944 – 03/1944 A.Muzychenko
 03/1944 – 02/1947 Illarion Kononenko
 03/1947 – 03/1952 Levko Medved
 03/1952 – 04/1954 Platon Shupyk
 07/1954 – 05/1956 Vasyl Bratus
 06/1956 – 03/1969 Platon Shupyk
 03/1969 – 04/1975 Vasyl Bratus
 04/1975 – 11/1989 Anatoliy Romanenko
 11/1989 – 06/1994 Yuriy Spizhenko

Ukraine

References

External links
 Statute on the Ministry of Healthcare

Healthcare